Traditional boat race at the 2015 Southeast Asian Games will be held in Marina Bay, Singapore from 6 to 7 June 2015.

Participating nations
A total of 148 athletes from six nations will be competing in traditional boat race at the 2015 Southeast Asian Games:

Medalists

Men

Women

Medal table

References

External links
 

Southeast Asian Games
2015 Southeast Asian Games events
2015